Young Heroes in Love was an American comic book series published by DC Comics; it ran for 18 issues (including the #1,000,000 issue) from 1997 to 1998. An uncommon combination of the superhero and romance genres, it introduced two LGBT male characters into the DC Universe – Frostbite and Off-Ramp – who were depicted becoming a couple, which was considered groundbreaking for the time. Unusually for a comic set in an established publisher-owned universe, Dan Raspler and Dev Madan retained copyright to the stories and art.

Publication history
The series was created by Dan Raspler and Dev Madan, and explored the trope of the "garage band" as it applied to superheroes: the Young Heroes (as they called themselves) were not so much a team as a somewhat haphazard grouping of superhumans who had been persuaded to work together, but were not really ready to deal with it.

The series was involved with two crossovers. Genesis featured some of the cast going through power-changes and the defeat of Kalibak. The #1,000,000 issue was a part of the DC One Million storyline. It featured mainly citizens of the future who resembled the characters but, near the end, had appearances by older versions of Off-Ramp and Frostbite.

Characters
 Hard Drive, also known as Jeremy Horton is the team's self-proclaimed leader. A powerful telekinetic and also has telepathic powers of persuasion which he keeps a secret. Hard Drive has preconceived notions as to how the team members should behave and interact, and was not above manipulating their minds and behaviors to fit these notions. He eventually has a nervous breakdown, after which he retires from being a hero and becomes governor of Connecticut.
 Off-Ramp, also known as George Sloan has the ability to open portals to anywhere in time and space and ride a vehicle through it. Off-Ramp's preferred vehicle is his hot-rod, a car he has named "Roadshow". He is eventually revealed to be one of a small clan of "travelers" who share his abilities. He is a loving father and his young son lives in Italy.
 Monstergirl, also known as Rita Lopez. She has the ability to shape shift into animals, monsters, and even human forms. Monstergirl joined the group along with her childhood friend Thunderhead. She eventually discovers that she is an alien being. She goes to work for Hard Drive when he becomes governor of Connecticut.
 Bonfire, also known as Anne Fletcher is a pyrokinetic. Hard Drive and Monstergirl tried to manipulate Bonfire into a romance with Thunderhead, but she was more interested in Frostbite.
 Thunderhead, also known as Scott Tucker, is superhumanly strong and resistant to damage. In the wake of the Genesis event, he gains electrical powers.
 Frostbite had cold-related powers, blue skin and hair, and pointed ears. He was later revealed to be bisexual, and to have a lifespan of more than 80,000 years (he appeared, visibly older but still functional, in the #1,000,000 issue).
 Junior, also known as Benjamin Newton is the most intelligent of the team, and stands at six inches tall. The laboratory accident responsible for his condition did not give him the ability to return to normal size.
 Zip-Kid, also known as Stacy Taglia, is able to shrink from human size to six inches tall, and (unlike Junior) to grow back to normal. She is also able to fly, and to fire concussive blasts from her hands.

References

External links
 The Unofficial Young Heroes in Love Title Index
 Young Heroes in Love Biography

DC Comics titles
DC Comics superhero teams
Male bisexuality in fiction
LGBT-related comics
1997 comics debuts
1990s LGBT literature
1998 comics endings
DC Comics LGBT superheroes